Ten Principles for the Establishment of a Monolithic Ideological System (also known as the Ten Principles of the One-Ideology System) are a set of ten principles and sixty-five clauses establishing standards for governance and guiding the behaviors of the people of North Korea. First published in 1974, the Ten Principles mandate absolute loyalty and obedience to the ideas of Kim Il-sung, and later his successor Kim Jong-il, establishing them as the country's supreme political authorities.

Development
The Principles were originally proposed in 1967 by Kim Yong-ju, the younger brother of North Korean leader Kim Il-sung, following the Kapsan Faction Incident that had unsuccessfully sought to challenge Kim Il-sung's authority and Kim Yong-ju's position as the heir apparent of that time. As such, the Monolithic Ideological System emerged in the context of internal policy debates within the Workers' Party of Korea and the external challenges posed by the Sino-Soviet split and Chinese Cultural Revolution. The System was implemented by Kim Il-sung in order to quash internal dissent and cement the Kim family's dominance over the North Korean political system. Kim Il-sung announced the System to the public in a speech held at the Supreme People's Assembly on 16 December 1967, entitled "Let Us Embody the Revolutionary Spirit of Independence, Self-Sustenance, and Self-Defense More Thoroughly in All Branches of State Activity".

The Principles were rewritten for publication by Kim Jong-il, with the help of Hwang Jang-yop, after Kim became Kim Il-sung's apparent successor in February 1974. The updated Principles were longer and further extended the personality cult surrounding Kim. The Principles attained an official status in the party in 1974. The Principles were amended for the first time in August 2013, and several new concepts such as Kimilsungism–Kimjongilism, the Songun Revolution, and nuclear statehood have been enshrined therein.

Implementation
The Ten Principles have come to supersede the Constitution of North Korea and edicts by the Workers' Party of Korea, and in practice, serve as the supreme law of the country.

In North Korea, the Ten Principles must be memorized by every citizen, and they ensure absolute loyalty and obedience to Kim Il-sung, Kim Jong-il, and Kim Jong-un. The Principles are integral to the political and daily lives of the people and are to be exercised through daily self-criticism sessions, in their work, school, etc., forming the foundation of the North Korean cult of personality. They are often compared with the Ten Commandments due to their similar role in shaping people's daily lives and the language they evoke and it is suspected that Kim Yong-ju's Christian past shaped them that way.

According to North Korean dictionaries, the Ten Principles are defined as follows: "The ideological system by which the whole party and people is firmly armed with the revolutionary ideology of the Suryeong (Great Leader) and united solidly around him, carrying out the revolutionary battle and construction battle under the sole leadership of the Suryeong."

Text

1974 version
The following version of the Principles was adopted by the party central committee in 1967 and announced in 1974.

We must give our all in the struggle to unify the entire society with the revolutionary ideology of the Great Leader Kim Il-sung.
We must honor the Great Leader comrade Kim Il-sung with all our loyalty.
We must make absolute the authority of the Great Leader comrade Kim Il-sung.
We must make the Great Leader comrade Kim Il-sung's revolutionary ideology our faith and make his instructions our creed.
We must adhere strictly to the principle of unconditional obedience in carrying out the Great Leader comrade Kim Il-sung's instructions.
We must strengthen the entire party's ideology and willpower and revolutionary unity, centering on the Great Leader comrade Kim Il-sung.
We must learn from the Great Leader comrade Kim Il-sung and adopt the communist look, revolutionary work methods and people-oriented work style.
We must value the political life we were given by the Great Leader comrade Kim Il-sung, and loyally repay his great political trust and thoughtfulness with heightened political awareness and skill.
We must establish strong organizational regulations so that the entire party, nation and military move as one under the one and only leadership of the Great Leader comrade Kim Il-sung.
We must pass down the great achievement of the revolution by the Great Leader comrade Kim Il-sung from generation to generation, inheriting and completing it to the end.

Detailed version
The Citizen's Alliance for North Korean Human Rights provides a more detailed version of the Principles.
Struggle with all your life to paint the entire society the single color of the Great Leader Comrade KIM Il Sung's revolutionary thought. It is considered the highest doctrine of our party to paint the entire society the single color of the Great Leader's revolutionary thought, and a higher level of task is to construct our party's unitary ideology system. 
Respect and revere highly and with loyalty the Great Leader Comrade KIM Il Sung. Highly revering the Great Leader Comrade Kim Il Sung is the noblest duty of the revolutionary warriors who are endlessly loyal to the great leader. Within this lies the glory of our nation and the eternal happiness of our people. 
Make absolute the authority of the Great Leader Comrade KIM Il Sung. Affirming the absolute nature of the Great Leader Comrade Kim Il Sung's authority is the supreme demand of our revolutionary task and the revolutionary volition of our party and people.
Accept the Great Leader Comrade KIM Il Sung's revolutionary thought as your belief and take the Great Leader's instructions as your creed. Accepting the Great Leader Comrade KIM Il Sung's thought as one's own belief and taking his instructions as one's creed is the most crucial element requested for one to become an endlessly loyal Juche communist warrior. It is also a precondition for the victory of our revolutionary struggle and its construction. 
Observe absolutely the principle of unconditional execution in carrying out the instructions of the Great Leader Comrade KIM Il Sung. Unconditionally executing the Great Leader Comrade KIM Il Sung's instructions is the basic requisite for proving loyalty towards the Great Leader, and the ultimate condition for the victory of our revolutionary struggle and its establishment. 
Rally the unity of ideological intellect and revolutionary solidarity around the Great Leader Comrade KIM Il Sung. The steel-like unity of the party is the source of the party's invincible power, and a firm assurance of the victory of our revolution. 
Learn from the Great Leader Comrade KIM Il Sung and master communist dignity, the methods of achieving revolutionary tasks, and the people's work styles. Learning the Great Leader Comrade Kim Il Sung's communist dignity, the methods of achieving revolutionary tasks, and the people's work styles are the divine duties of all members of the party and workers, and the prerequisite for fulfilling the honorary fate of revolutionary warriors. 
Preserve dearly the political life the Great Leader Comrade KIM Il Sung has bestowed upon you, and repay loyally with high political awareness and skill for the Great Leader's boundless political trust and considerations. It is our highest honor to have bestowed upon us political life by the Great Leader Comrade KIM Il Sung and repaying his trust loyally can lead to a bright future for our political life. 
Establish a strong organizational discipline so that the entire Party, the entire people, and the entire military will operate uniformly under the sole leadership of the Great Leader Comrade KIM Il Sung. Establishing a strong organizational discipline is the essential requirement to strengthen the party's collective ideology, leadership, and its combat power. It is also a firm assurance for the victory of our revolutionary struggle and its establishment. 
 The great revolutionary accomplishments pioneered by the Great Leader Comrade KIM Il Sung must be succeeded and perfected by hereditary succession until the end. The firm establishment of the sole leadership system is the crucial assurance for the preservation and development of the Great leader's revolutionary accomplishments, while achieving the final victory of the revolution.

2013 version
After Kim Jong-il's death in 2011, the Principles were updated to included his name alongside Kim Il-sung's with a new name: "Ten Principles for the Establishment of the Party's Single Leadership System".

 We must give our all in the struggle to unify the entire society with Kimilsungism and Kimjongilism.
 We must honor the great Comrades Kim Il-sung and Kim Jong-il as the eternal leaders of our Party and the people and as the Sun of Juche.
 We must make absolute and desperately defend the authority of the great Comrades Kim Il-sung and Kim Jong-il and the authority of the Party.
 We must be thoroughly armed with the revolutionary ideas of the great Comrades Kim Il-sung and Kim Jong-il and the Party’s lines and policies that are the realization of these ideas.
 We must adhere strictly to the principle of unconditional obedience in accomplishing the instructions passed on by the great Comrades Kim Il-sung and Kim Jong-il and in the Party’s lines and policies.
 We must strengthen by all possible means the entire Party’s ideology, willpower, and revolutionary unity, centering on the Leader.
 We must learn from the great Comrades Kim Il-sung and Kim Jong-il and adopt the noble mental and moral presence, revolutionary work methods, and people-oriented work style.
 We must value the political life we were given by the Party and the Leader and loyally repay the Party’s trust and thoughtfulness with heightened political awareness and work performance.
 We must establish strong organizational regulations so that the entire Party, nation, and military move as one under the one and only leadership of the Party.
 We must pass down the great achievement of the Juche revolution and the Songun revolution, pioneered by the great Comrade Kim Il-sung and led by Comrades Kim Il-sung and Kim Jong-il, from generation to generation, inheriting and completing it to the end.

See also

 Kimilsungism–Kimjongilism
 Juche
 Songun

References

Works cited

Juliana Dowling & Dae Un Hong (2021). The Enshrinement of Nuclear Statehood in North Korean Law: Its Implications for Future Denuclearization Talks with North Korea. Illinois Law Review Online. 2021 Spring: 48–62. online

Further reading

External links
Ten Principles for the Establishment of the One-Ideology System, English. Columbia Law School (archived here)
Ten Detailed Principles for the Establishment of the One-Ideology System, English. Citizens' Alliance for North Korean Human Rights

Ideology of the Workers' Party of Korea
Korean nationalism
Law of North Korea
Politics of North Korea
Communist theory
Codes of conduct
1967 documents